Román Ignacio Tello Olivares (born November 2, 1994) is a Chilean footballer who currently plays for Swedish club Nyköpings BIS as a left back.

Career

Even though he was born in Ovalle, he began his career playing for Coquimbo Unido, a club based in a nearby city to his birthplace, making his debut at the 2012–13 Copa Chile. On 2014–15 season, he was loaned to Deportes Ovalle at the Segunda División, the third level of Chilean football.

After having no chances in Chilean football and studying Management and Business, he decided to look for any chance in Swedish football in late 2015, beginning an ongoing career in that country. In 2020, he joined Ettan Södra club Assyriska IK. In 2022, he joined Nyköpings BIS in the Swedish Division 2.

Honours

Club
Coquimbo Unido
 Primera B (1): 2014-C

References

External links
 

Living people
1994 births
People from Ovalle
Chilean footballers
Chilean expatriate footballers
Coquimbo Unido footballers
Deportes Ovalle footballers
AIK Fotboll players
Vasalunds IF players
IFK Värnamo players
Assyriska IK players
Nyköpings BIS players
Primera B de Chile players
Segunda División Profesional de Chile players
Ettan Fotboll players
Division 2 (Swedish football) players
Association football defenders
Chilean expatriate sportspeople in Sweden
Expatriate footballers in Sweden